Viorel Ion (born 2 November 1967) is a Romanian football manager. Throughout his playing career, Viorel Ion played for several teams, including Oțelul Galați, Steaua București, VfL Bochum and Rapid București. He was player-manager of Gloria Buzău, which he helped promote to Liga I during the 2006–07 season.

Career
Ion was born in Buzău. His Romanian first league debut took place in 1984, at the age of 17, playing for Gloria Buzău. In 1991, he left his club, at the time relegated to Liga II, for Oțelul Galați. Nicknamed Vioară (Violin), he subsequently transferred to Steaua București, winning three Romanian Champion titles with that team. From Steaua, he went on to play in the German Bundesliga for VfL Bochum. Upon his return to Romania, he played for Rapid București and Oțelul Galați again.

Ion made four appearances for the Romania national football team.

Player-manager of Gloria Buzău
In 2001, he returned to Buzău, to find his old team, Gloria, relegated to the Romanian third division. He took over as player-manager and promoted the team back to Liga II in his first year. Later on, he attempted to lead Gloria to Liga I in 2005, when the team lost the promotion play-off to Politehnica Timișoara. Viorel Ion succeeded to promote Gloria Buzău to Liga I during the 2006–07 season, after finishing second. After losing the first two games of the 2007–08 season, Ion resigned his position as player-manager in favor of his colleague Ilie Stan, and took on other management position with Gloria Buzău.

Honours

Club
Steaua Bucharest
Romanian League (3): 1992–93, 1993–94, 1994–95

Notes 
 The 1987–1988, 1989–1991 appearances and goals made for Gloria Buzău are unavailable.
 The 1988–1989 appearances made for Gloria Buzău are unavailable.
 The 2001–2002 appearances and goals made for Gloria Buzău are unavailable.

References

External links
 
 

1967 births
Living people
People from Buzău
Association football forwards
Romanian footballers
Romania international footballers
Liga I players
Bundesliga players
Romanian expatriate sportspeople in Germany
Expatriate footballers in Germany
Romanian expatriate footballers
FC Gloria Buzău players
ASC Oțelul Galați players
FC Steaua București players
VfL Bochum players
FC Rapid București players
Romanian football managers
FC Gloria Buzău managers
AFC Dacia Unirea Brăila managers
CS Otopeni managers